The Sandhi Muslims are a community found in the state of Gujarat in India. Sandhi Muslims belong to a Samma tribe from Sindh. They are one of a number of communities of pastoral nomads found in the Banni region of Kutch.

History and origin
They are Samma who converted to Islam. The Sandhi are said to have emigrated about 300 years before Independence from Sindh to Kutch and Saurashtra. In Saurashtra, they are found mainly in Junagadh district. They speak Kutchi with many Sindhi loanwords.

Present circumstances
The Sandhi are an endogamous community, and are divided into 104 clans. They do not practice clan exogamy. Their major clans include the Jam, Lakha, Sameja, Gaha, Gajan, Abada, Sandh, Jokhiya, zakhra, Hothi, Hala, Hingora, Halapotra, Shetha, Notiyar, Fulani, Otha, Unad, Sama, Sora, seta Sumra, Jadeja, Nareja, Juneja, Paleja, Koreja, Dal, Deda, Chaniya, Rayma, Rathod, Bolim, Bukera, Solanki, Theba, Sodha, and Khokhar.

The Sandhi of Kutch are a community of Maldhari cattle breeders. They take their cattle to the bazaars of Bhuj. They also raise goats and buffaloes. Like other Kutchi communities, many of them have migrated to other parts of India in search of employment. They are Sunni Muslims and most follow the Hanafi madhhab. In Saurashtra, the Sandhi are mainly farmers, living on their own settlements. They have a statewide association, the Akhil Saurashtra Sindhi Muslim Vikas Jamat, which deals with community issues.

References

 Sindhi Muslim in India

Social groups of Gujarat
Tribes of Kutch
Maldhari communities
Muslim communities of India
Sindhi tribes

Sindhi tribes in India
Muslim communities of Gujarat
Islam in Sindh
 Sindhis
https://www.sandhimuslim.com/
Samma Dynasty
History of Kutch